Time Clock Wizard, Inc is a New York-based online company known for its eponymous employee time tracking app.

History
The company was founded as a single-product company by the CEO, Sean Wolf, in February 2014.

Time Clock Wizard is a freemium software, which includes a mobile app, that allows unlimited users and employees to work in a single schedule, whereas, optional services such as web design, merchant accounts and other business loans credit to the company's business model. These optional features are often shown in the software dashboard.

The company additionally provides payroll functionality as a part of its basic software application to allow for payroll generation, overtime, and reporting.

Time Clock Wizard, Inc. featured in multiple media outlets and website reviews including Dr. Wright TV Show Website in December of 2014 The company has also been cited as one of the "10 Best Time Tracking Apps For Designers & Developers".

Features
The basic software application contains the following features:
 Schedule & task management
 Time and presence tracking
 Receive email or text alert for unscheduled time in or out
 GPS tracking via mobile app
 Photo capture
 Payroll management & reporting
 Reimbursements

See also 
Comparison of time-tracking software
Employee-scheduling software
Project-management software

References

External links
Time Clock Wizard website

Time-tracking software
Companies based in New York (state)